La dernière bourrée à Paris is a 1973 French comedy film, directed by Raoul André.

Plot
Berthe who live a too peaceful life is fascinated by the film Brando loves in Last Tango in Paris. From there, she saw only through the eyes of the heroine she is literally bewitched ...

Cast

 Patricia Lesieur as Berthe Payrac
 Tony Kendall as Victor
 Francis Blanche as Gaston Payrac
 Michel Galabru as Jules Payrac
 Marion Game as Lucie
 Daniel Prévost as Philippe
 Paul Préboist as Émile
 Jacques Préboist as François
 Danièle Nègre as Solange
 Annie Cordy as The psychoanalyst
 Roger Coggio as Man from Trust
 Micheline Dax as The apartment's owner
 Nicole Gobbi as The prostitute
 Christian Marin
 Darling Légitimus
 Paul Bisciglia
 Bernard Musson

References

External links

1973 films
1970s French-language films
1973 comedy films
French comedy films
Films directed by Raoul André
Films scored by Vladimir Cosma
1970s French films